Rubbestadneset is a village in Bømlo municipality in Vestland county, Norway. The Stokksundet strait lies to the east and the Innværfjorden lies to the south and west. 

Wichmann Diesel motors originate from Rubbestadneset.  Rubbestadnes Upper Secondary School is located in the village.

Notable residents
 Finn Haldorsen (1934—2005), Businessman
 Knut Arild Hareide (born 1972), Politician
 Martin Sandvik (born 1986), Musician

References

Villages in Vestland
Bømlo